WHSX (99.1 FM) is a radio station broadcasting a country music format. Licensed to Edmonton, Kentucky, the station serves the Bowling Green metropolitan area. The station is owned by Vikki Froggett and David Ray Froggett, Jr., through licensee South 65 Communications, LLC.

History
WHSX debuted on September 29, 1989, with the call sign WSRG. On January 30, 1990, the station changed its call sign to WKNK, and on September 1, 2005, to the current WHSX.

References

External links

HSX
1989 establishments in Kentucky
Radio stations established in 1989
Edmonton, Kentucky